Aleksandr Leonidovich Vishnevsky was a Russian actor and one of the founding members of the Moscow Art Theatre.

Biography
Vishnevsky studied at the Taganrog gymnasium where he befriended the young Anton Chekhov. From 1883 he took part in the performances of the Taganrog Music and Drama Society. Later he acted in the theatres of Kharkiv, Yekaterinoslav, Odessa, Saratov where he was a jeune premier. In 1898 he joined the troupe of the Moscow Art Theatre (MAT). On the opening night of the MAT, Vishnevsky played the part of Boris Godunov in the play Tsar Fyodor Ioannovich by Aleksey Konstantinovich Tolstoy. In 1899 he played Godunov again in Tolstoy's The Death of Ivan the Terrible. Vishnevsky was the first to play the title role in Chekhov's play Uncle Vanya at the MAT.

In 1933 Vishnevsky became the first actor to be awarded the title of Hero of Labour (later replaced with Hero of Socialist Labour). He was also awarded the title of Honored Art Worker of the RSFSR. He died on 27 February 1943 in Tashkent where he lived in evacuation. He is buried in Tashkent. His son is Aleksandr Vishnevsky, who was a journalist and a senior official at the TASS. His daughter is Natalia Vishnevskaya.

Career

Theatre roles
(at the Moscow Art Theatre):
1898 – Tsar Fyodor Ioannovich by Aleksey Konstantinovich Tolstoy – Boris Godunov
1898 – The Merchant of Venice by William Shakespeare – Antonio
1899 – The Death of Ivan the Terrible by Aleksey Konstantinovich Tolstoy – Boris Godunov
1900 – An Enemy of the People by Henrik Ibsen – Hovstad
1902 – The Lower Depths by Maxim Gorky – Tatar
1903 – Julius Caesar by William Shakespeare – Mark Antonius
1906 – Woe from Wit by Alexander Griboyedov – Count Tugoukhovsky
1907 – Boris Godunov by Alexander Pushkin – Boris Godunov

Filmography
1918 – Cagliostro (“The False Masons”), Russia, Rus, black-and-white
1927 – Woman's Victory aka Pobeda zhenschiny (“Boyar Nikit Yurievich”), USSR, Mezhrabpomrus, black-and-white, 62 min.

Acknowledgement and awards
 Hero of Labour (1933)
 Honored Art Worker of the RSFSR (1933)
Order of the Red Banner of Labour (1937)

References
 Encyclopaedia of Taganrog, 2nd edition, Taganrog, 2003

External links
 

1861 births
1943 deaths
19th-century male actors from the Russian Empire
20th-century Russian male actors
Actors from Taganrog
People from Yekaterinoslav Governorate
Moscow Art Theatre
Recipients of the Order of the Red Banner of Labour
Male actors from the Russian Empire
Russian male actors
Russian male film actors
Russian male stage actors
Soviet male actors
Soviet male film actors
Soviet male stage actors